Capitan Mountains Wilderness is a  Wilderness area located within the Lincoln National Forest in New Mexico. The area was added to the National Wilderness Preservation System on December 19, 1980 by Public Law 96-550. Located in the Capitan Mountains, this area is recognized as the birthplace of Smokey Bear. There are a number of trails through the wilderness, but access to trailheads is difficult as most are only reachable by four-wheel-drive roads.

References

External links 
Capitan Mountains Wilderness Area, official Lincoln National Forest site

Wilderness areas of New Mexico
Protected areas of Lincoln County, New Mexico